The Land Rover DC100 (Defender Concept 100") is an off-road concept vehicle from Land Rover originally intended to demonstrate what the vehicle that will replace the long-running Defender in 2020 will look like. The DC100 was first unveiled to the public in September 2011 at the Frankfurt Motor Show.

Versions
Land Rover announced two versions at Frankfurt, a three-door estate off road car powered by a diesel engine and a more leisure orientated two-door sport version with no roof powered by a petrol engine. . 

The design was led by Gerry McGovern, director of design for Land Rover.

Reception
Land Rover’s brand director, John Edwards, revealed to Autocar that he was "massively encouraged" by the reaction to the DC100, and by the fact that people thought they were looking at a £45,000 vehicle. "It’s £20,000 to £25,000 in reality," he said.

The new entry-level model would be part of what Land Rover internally refers to as its leisure-oriented range, the others being utility (Defender) and luxury (Range Rovers, including the Evoque).

References

External links
 Land Rover DC100 concept at Land Rover global website]
 Land Rover DC100 Expedition Concept at Land Rover USA website

DC100
Concept cars